William Dallman (8 August 1918 – 1988) was an English professional footballer who played in the Football League for Mansfield Town.

References

1918 births
1988 deaths
English footballers
Association football defenders
English Football League players
Notts County F.C. players
Mansfield Town F.C. players